Blubberhouses is a small village and civil parish located in the Washburn Valley in the borough of Harrogate in North Yorkshire, a county in the north of England. The population as at the 2011 Census was less than 100, so details were included in the civil parish of Fewston. In 2015, North Yorkshire County Council estimated the population of the village and parish to be 40. Blubberhouses is situated to the south of the Yorkshire Dales National Park, and to the north of a Roman road and Fewston Reservoir on the A59 road linking Harrogate to Skipton.

History
The name of the village derives from the Anglo-Saxon bluberhūs = "the house(s) which is/are at the bubbling stream", with a later regularised plural; the -um form came from the Anglo-Saxon dative plural case æt bluberhūsum = "at the houses which ...". Later forms of the name on record include "Bluburgh", "Bluborrow", and "Bluburhouse". A forge was recorded at Blubberhouses in 1227, and in the 16th century, the village had a metal smelters for lead and iron ore. The lead was mined locally around Fewston. The other major industry in the area was cloth-working with Westhouse mill being located just across the A59 road from the church. Westhouse opened in the 1790s to process flax, but closed in 1877 and the stone from the mill was used in the construction of the dam wall of Fewston Reservoir.

The Anglican village church of St Andrew's was designed by Edward Buckton Lamb and was built in 1851. It is now a grade II listed building. It is part of the ecclesiastical parish of Fewston, and is maintained by the Friends of Blubberhouses Church, after is was decided to keep the church open in 2015 in spite of the need to repair the church roof at quite a cost. The village has a cricket team who play in the Theakston Nidderdale League, and their ground is alongside the River Washburn in the village.

The road through Blubberhouses, what is now the A59, running in an east/west direction, was first turnpiked in the 1770s. The section to the west of Blubberhouses towards Skipton goes over Blubberhouses Moor, and between 1823 and 1827, a new cut was made to the south with a gentler grade, but following the contours of the hill. The 19th century section has suffered many landslips, and so a new bypass, following the route of the original turnpike is due to open in 2025.

In July 2014, Stage 2 of the 2014 Tour de France from York to Sheffield, passed through the village. It was also the location of the first climb of the stage, the Category 4 Côte de Blubberhouses, at the  point. The single point for the King of the Mountains competition was claimed by Frenchman, Cyril Lemoine of Cofidis.

Blubberhouses is used as a key setting for local composer Andy Tillison's composition Le Sacre Du Travail, a five movement electric sinfonia recorded by the progressive rock ensemble The Tangent. The work is, according to the CD sleeve notes, loosely based around Igor Stravinsky's Le Sacre Du Printemps (The Rite Of Spring). One section of the second movement is named "Dawn At Blubberhouses" and the village is mentioned by name in the lyrics/libretto. A short story in the CD sleeve describes the journey of a man travelling to work through the village in the small hours of the morning. The CD album was released in 2013 by the German record label Inside Out Music.

Governance 
There is no record of Blubberhouses in the Domesday Book, but it is recorded in 1172 as Bluberh(o)usum, being in the lower division of the wapentake of Claro in the West Riding of Yorkshire. It is now in the county of North Yorkshire. The village and parish is represented at Parliament as part of the Skipton and Ripon Constituency. In 2011, the population was estimated to be 30, which by 2015, had risen to 40.

Notes

References

Sources

External links

Landslide near Blubberhouses September 2010 British Geological Survey

Villages in North Yorkshire
Civil parishes in North Yorkshire